Point de France is a type of needle lace developed in the late 17th century. It is characterized by rich and symmetrical detail, and a reliance on symbols associated with King Louis XIV of France, such as suns, sunflowers, fleurs-de-lys, and crowns.

History 
During the 1660s, King Louis XIV of France was spending extravagant sums on lace from the Republic of Venice, particularly a type known as point de Venise, to the dismay of his finance minister, Jean-Baptiste Colbert. In order to redirect this spending into the French economy, Colbert set up a number of official royal lace factories, which were to produce a type of lace he named point de France. He worked with the French ambassador to Venice to tempt needle-workers from Venice, Italy, and Flanders to emigrate to France, prompting the Doge of Venice to declare that defection to France by needle-workers was a treasonous act punishable by execution or assassination. It is unclear whether this threat was ever carried out; regardless, enough Venetian needle-workers emigrated that the French quickly learned to produce high-quality lace.

Point de France was popularized by the clergy, who used it for the ornaments of their rochets, a type of clerical vestment. 

Most surviving pieces from the 16th and 17th centuries are now in museums.

References

Citations

Bibliography 
 

Needle lace
Textile arts of France